Tortula is a genus of mosses in the family Pottiaceae.

Species
There are different classifications for the species included in the genus.

The delimitation of genus Tortula is problematic and was subject to a number of alterations in the past. Some species that were earlier placed under Desmatodon, Phascum and Pottia have been made part of genus Tortula, while other species that had been formerly placed in this genus became part of Hennediella, Microbryum and Syntrichia. The rearrangement of the genus followed new studies in gametophyte characteristics.
 Tortula acaulon (With.) R. H. Zander
 Tortula acaulon var. pilifera (Schreb. ex Hedw.) R.H. Zander
 Tortula ammonsiana Crum & Anderson – Ammons' Tortula Moss
 Tortula amphidiacea (C. Müll.) Broth. – Tortula Moss
 Tortula amplexa (Lesq.) Steere – Tortula Moss
 Tortula antarctica (Hampe) Par. – Screw Moss
 Tortula atrovirens (Sm.) Lindb. – Convolute Desmatodon Moss
 Tortula bartramii Steere in Grout – Bartram's Tortula Moss
 Tortula bolanderi (Lesq.) Howe – Bolander's Tortula Moss
 Tortula brevipes (Lesq.) Broth. – Tortula Moss
 Tortula cainii Crum & Anderson – Cain's Tortula Moss
 Tortula californica Bartr. – California Tortula Moss
 Tortula canescens Mont.
 Tortula caucasica Lindb. ex Broth. – Intermediate Pottia Moss
 Tortula cernua (Huebener) R. H. Zander – Desmatodon Moss
 Tortula chisosa Magill, Delgad. & L.R. Stark – Tortula Moss
 Tortula cuneifolia (Dicks.) Turner
 Tortula freibergii Dixon & Loeske
 Tortula hoppeana (Schultz) Ochyra – Wideleaf Desmatodon Moss
 Tortula lindbergii Kindb. ex Broth. – Lance Pottia Moss
 Tortula lingulata Lindb.
 Tortula marginata (Bruch & Schimp.) Spruce
 Tortula mucronifolia Schwägr. – Mucronleaf Tortula Moss
 Tortula muralis Hedw. – Wall Screw-moss
 Tortula muralis var. aestiva Brid. ex Hedw.
 Tortula muralis var. muralis Hedw.
 Tortula obtusifolia (Schwägr.) Mathieu – Obtuseleaf Desmatodon Moss
 Tortula obtusissima (C. Müll.) Mitt. – Obtuse Tortula Moss
 Tortula papillosissima (Copp.) Broth. – Tortula Moss
 Tortula paulsenii Broth.
 Tortula princeps De Not. – Tortula Moss
 Tortula protobryoides R. H. Zander – Pottia Moss
 Tortula rhizophylla (Sak.) Iwats. & Saito – Tortula Moss
 Tortula schimperi Cano, O. Werner & J. Guerra
 Tortula scotteri Zand. & Steere – Scotter's Tortula Moss
 Tortula stanfordensis Steere – Stanford 
 Tortula subulata Hedw. – Tortula Moss
 Tortula truncata (Hedw.) Mitt. – Truncate Pottia Moss

References

External links

Pottiaceae
Moss genera
Taxa named by Johann Hedwig